This is a list of noteworthy defunct comic book conventions (as distinct from anime conventions, furry conventions, gaming conventions, horror conventions, multigenre conventions, and science fiction conventions). This a companion to List of comic book conventions.

Africa

Ivory Coast 
 Coco Bulles (2001–2007)

Europe

Italy 
 Komikazen in Ravenna (2005-2016)
 Treviso Comics in Treviso (1976-2003)

Portugal 
 Amadora BD in Amadora, Portugal (1989-2019)

Sweden 
 UppCon, Uppsala, Sweden (2002-2012)

United Kingdom 
 British Comic Art Convention, England (1968–1981)
 CAPTION, England (1992–2017)
 Comic Expo (Bristol International Comic & Small Press Expo), Bristol, England (2004–2014) — successor to Comic Festival
 Comic Festival, Bristol, England (1999–2004) — began as "Comic 99"
 Comic Mart, London (1972– 1987)
 Hi-Ex, Inverness, Scotland (2008–2012)
 United Kingdom Comic Art Convention (UKCAC), London, England (1985–1998) — final convention took place in Manchester

North America

Canada 
 Toronto Comic Con, Toronto (2003–2012) — acquired by Wizard Entertainment in 2009

United States 
 Academy Con, New York City (1965–1967)
 Adventure Con, Knoxville, Tennessee (2002–2012)
 Atlanta Fantasy Fair, Atlanta (1975–1995)
 Boston Comic Con, Boston (2007–2017)
 Comic Art Convention, New York City (1968–1983) — also held in Philadelphia from 1977–1979
 Comix Fair, Houston (1983–c. 1996) — replaced the defunct Houstoncon
 ConGlomeration, Louisville (2001-2019)
 Creation Con, New York City (1971–1988) — variously named "Big Comicon Creation Convention," "Creation Comic Book & Pop Culture Convention," "Creation '78,", etc.
 Dallas Fantasy Fair, Dallas (1982–1995)
 Detroit Triple Fan Fair, Detroit (1965–1978)
 FantaCon, Albany, New York (1979–1990; 2013)
 Houstoncon, Houston (1967–1982)
 Intervention, Washington, D.C. area (2010-2016)
 Magnum Opus Con, Georgia and South Carolina (1986–2001)
 Metro Con, Washington. D.C. (1970–1971) — produced by teenager Gary Groth; attendees included Phil Seuling, Bud Plant, and Dave Cockrum
 Multicon, Oklahoma City (1970–1982)
 New York International Sci-Fi and Fantasy Creators Convention, Madison Square Garden, New York City (1999–2000)
 OrlandoCon, Orlando (1974–1994)
 Ramapo Comic Con (1987–c. 1998), Ramapo High School, Spring Valley, New York — sponsored by the Ramapo High School Comic Book Club; known for its annual roster of high-profile comic creator guests
 Stumptown Comics Fest, Portland, Oregon (2004–2013)
 UnCommonCon, Dallas (2000–2001)
 Wildcat Comic Con, Williamsport, Pennsylvania (2012–2014)

Notes

References 

 
Entertainment lists